Tanner Richie is an American actor and real estate agent, representing a variety of high profile clients including entertainment celebrities, social media influencers, Doctors, CEOs and more. He is licensed in both California and Oregon, with the majority of his business based in London.

In addition to real estate, Tanner is known for his work as a singer/songwriter/music producer and certified audio engineer.  With songs on over 430 television episodes, some of his notable placements include Real Housewives of Miami, Real Housewives of Atlanta, The Steve Harvey Show, Say Yes to The Dress, Fox Sports Live, E! News Live, Dance Moms, and many more. In addition, he has recorded the gamut from new artists to a five-time GRAMMY Award winner.

-

During his childhood and teenage years, Tanner made many onscreen/onstage appearances. At the age of 9, he played Gavroche in the Broadway International Tour of Les Misérables. During his 6 months with the production, he performed across the United States at many prestigious theaters, in Shanghai, China at the Shanghai Grand Theater, and in Seoul, Korea.

In 2005, Tanner shared the screen with Fran Drescher in her WB Show, Living With Fran. In 2006, he was nominated for a Young Artist Award for the Best Performance in a Television Series (Comedy or Drama) as a guest starring young actor for Nip/Tuck. Other notable roles include Simon Stevens in the Hallmark TV movie Love's Unending Legacy (2007), a voice feature in The Cleveland Show, and co-star roles in Numb3rs, Threshold, and Gilmore Girls.

Filmography
 Love's Unending Legacy (2007) .... Simon Stevens
 Family (2006) .... Cole
 Nip/Tuck (3 episodes, 2005)
 Hannah Tedesco (2005) TV episode .... Austin Morretti
 Tommy Bolton (2005) TV episode .... Austin Morretti
 Ben White (2005) TV episode .... Austin Morretti
 Threshold .... Young Tate (1 episode, 2005)
 The Burning (2005) TV episode (voice) .... Young Tate
 Living with Fran .... Vince Lombardi (1 episode, 2005)
 Carriage Ride (2005) TV episode .... Vince Lombardi
 Gilmore Girls .... Papa (1 episode, 2005)
... aka Gilmore Girls: Beginnings (U.S.: rerun title) 
 Jews and Chinese Food (2005) TV episode .... Papa
 Numb3rs .... David Kramer (1 episode, 2005)
... aka Numb3ers (U.S.: promotional title) 
 Vector (2005) TV episode .... David Kramer
 Father of the Pride .... Bully / .... (1 episode, 2004)
 Sarmoti Moves In (2004) TV episode (voice) .... Rabbit/Monkey/Bully
 The Nutcracker and the Mouseking (2004) (V) (voice) .... Nicholas
... aka Nussknacker und Mäusekönig (Germany) 
 Mrs Marshall'' (2004) .... Anthony Mauro

References

External links

Living people
American real estate brokers
American male child actors
American male television actors
American male film actors
1992 births
American expatriate male actors in the United Kingdom